Gurué District is a district of Zambezia Province in Mozambique. The principal town is Gurué. Gurué is the country's largest tea-estate and has a population of around 116, 922.

Settlements 
Gurué
Lioma

Geography
Gurué is located 350 km from the next international airport in Blantyre, Malawi.

Economy
The economy is 90% based on tea plantations, though fruit, coffee, and other plantations do exist. Most people have small subsistence farms because they receive irregular salaries.

Further reading
District profile (PDF)

Districts in Zambezia Province

e